Pertengo is a comune (municipality) in the Province of Vercelli in the Italian region Piedmont, located about  northeast of Turin and about  south of Vercelli.

Pertengo borders the following municipalities: Asigliano Vercellese, Costanzana, Rive, and Stroppiana.

References

Cities and towns in Piedmont